Schwarzenbach an der Saale is a town in the district of Hof, in Bavaria, Germany. It is situated on the river Saale, 11 km south of Hof. 

Within the town is the Gedenkstätte Langer Gang, a memorial to the Nazi victims of the Helmbrechts concentration camp, which was near Schwarzenbach an der Saale, and particularly of the victims of the death march from Helmbrechts concentration camp to Volary.

After the war, Erika Fuchs, German translator of Carl Barks's comics, lived and worked in Schwarzenbach for fifty years. A museum in memory of her and her work was opened in the town in 2015, known as Erika-Fuchs-Haus.

Jean Paul, a German Romantic writer, also lived in this town from 1790 to 1794. Schwarzenbach is also mentioned in of his works.

References

Hof (district)